Pohlia is a genus of mosses in the family Mniaceae, found on all continents including Antarctica. Some of its species are native to multiple continents. The center of diversity is the Northern Hemisphere.

The genus name of Pohlia is in honour of Johann Ehrenfried Pohl (1746–1800), who was a German physician and botanist. 

The genus was circumscribed by Johann Hedwig in Descriptio et Adumbratio microscopio-analytica Muscorum
Frondosorum vol.1 on page 98 in 1785-1787.

Species
Currently accepted species include:

Pohlia afrocruda Brotherus
Pohlia alba Lindberg & H.Arnell
Pohlia aloysii-sabaudiae Negri
Pohlia alteoperculata (Dixon)
Pohlia ampullacea Hampex Gangulee
Pohlia andalusica Brotherus
Pohlia andrewsii A.J.Shaw
Pohlia annotina Lindberg
Pohlia apolensis R.S.Williams
Pohlia aristatula H.A.Miller, H.O.Whittier & B.Whittier
Pohlia atropurpurea (Wahlenb.) H.Lindb.
Pohlia atrothecia Brotherus
Pohlia atrovirens
Pohlia australis A.J.Shaw & Fife
Pohlia austroelongata Brotherus
Pohlia austropolymorpha Brotherus
Pohlia baldwinii Schultze-Motel
Pohlia barbuloides Ochi
Pohlia baronii Wijk & Margadant
Pohlia beccarii (Müll.Hal.) Watts & Whitel.
Pohlia bequaertii A.J.Shaw
Pohlia beringiensis A.J.Shaw
Pohlia betulina Warnstorf
Pohlia bolanderi Brotherus
Pohlia brachystoma Fleischer
Pohlia brevinervis Lindberg & H.Arnell
Pohlia brevireticulata Warnstorf
Pohlia brideliana Wijk & Margadant
Pohlia bulbifera Warnstorf
Pohlia caespitosa (Hoppe & Hornsch.) Lazarenko
Pohlia calopyxis Brotherus
Pohlia camptotrachela Brotherus
Pohlia cardotii Brotherus
Pohlia cavaleriei Redfearn & B.C.Tan
Pohlia chilensis A.J.Shaw
Pohlia chitralensis Størmer
Pohlia chlorocarpa (Cardot & Thér.) Broth.
Pohlia chrysoblasta Demaret
Pohlia cirrhifera De Not.
Pohlia clavaeformis Brotherus
Pohlia clavicaulis F.J.Hermann
Pohlia columbica Andrews
Pohlia crassicostata Brotherus
Pohlia cratericola Broth.
Pohlia cruda Lindberg
Pohlia crudoides Brotherus
Pohlia cruegeri (Hampe) A.L.Andrews
Pohlia cucullata Bruch
Pohlia cuspidata E.B.Bartram
Pohlia debatii Brotherus
Pohlia densiretis
Pohlia drummondii Andrews
Pohlia elatior Sainsbury
Pohlia elongata Hedwig
Pohlia emergens A.J.Shaw
Pohlia erecta Lindberg
Pohlia excelsa Kindberg
Pohlia excurrens E.B.Bartram
Pohlia fauriei (Cardot) Iisiba
Pohlia fauriei Iishiba
Pohlia filiformis (Dicks.) A.L.Andrews
Pohlia filum Mårtensson
Pohlia flexuosa Harv.
Pohlia flexuosa W.J.Hooker
Pohlia fluviatilis
Pohlia formosica Dixon
Pohlia geniculata Wijk & Margadant
Pohlia grammocarpa Brotherus
Pohlia grammophylla Brotherus
Pohlia grandiretis Warnst.
Pohlia gromieri Kis
Pohlia hamiltonii Dixon
Pohlia hampeana Broth.
Pohlia hisae T.Koponen & Luo Jian-xin
Pohlia humilis Brotherus
Pohlia hyaloperistoma Da-cheng Zhang, X.J.Li & Higuchi
Pohlia imbricata Schwägr.
Pohlia inflexa Wijk & Margadant
Pohlia kenyae Kis
Pohlia korbiana Wijk & Margadant
Pohlia lacouturei O'Shea
Pohlia lacustris (F.Weber & D.Mohr) Schwägr.
Pohlia laticuspes (Broth.) P.C.Chen ex Redf. & B.C.Tan
Pohlia laticuspis Chen Pan-chieh ex Redfearn & B.C.Tan
Pohlia leptoclada
Pohlia leptodontium Brotherus
Pohlia leptopoda Brotherus
Pohlia lescuriana Ochi
Pohlia leucostoma Fleischer
Pohlia lonchochaete Brotherus
Pohlia longibracteata Brotherus
Pohlia longicolla (Hedw.) Lindb.
Pohlia longicollis Lindberg
Pohlia looseri S.He
Pohlia loriformis F.J.Hermann
Pohlia ludwigii Brotherus
Pohlia lutescens H.Lindberg
Pohlia macleai Schelpe
Pohlia macrocarpa Da-cheng Zhang, X.J.Li & Higuchi
Pohlia magnifica S.He
Pohlia mandonii Schimp.
Pohlia marchica Osterald
Pohlia mauiensis Schultze-Motel
Pohlia melanodon A.J.Shaw
Pohlia microspora (Kindb.) Broth.
Pohlia mielichhoferia Brotherus
Pohlia mielichhoferiacea (Müll.Hal.) Broth.
Pohlia minor Schleich. ex Schwägr.
Pohlia myurella Broth.
Pohlia nemicaulon Brotherus
Pohlia nevadensis Brotherus
Pohlia novae-seelandiae Dixon
Pohlia nudicaulis (Lesquereux) Brotherus
Pohlia nutans Lindberg
Pohlia nutanti-polymorpha Brotherus
Pohlia obtusata Kindb.
Pohlia obtusifolia L.F.Koch
Pohlia ochii Vitt
Pohlia oedoneura Brotherus
Pohlia oerstediana A.J.Shaw
Pohlia orthocarpula Brotherus
Pohlia pacifica A.J.Shaw
Pohlia papillosa Brotherus
Pohlia paradoxa Huebener
Pohlia philonotula Brotherus
Pohlia platyphylla Schwägr.
Pohlia plumella Brotherus
Pohlia pluriseta Herzog
Pohlia polycarpa (Mitt.) Broth.
Pohlia procerrima Fleischer
Pohlia proligera (Kindb.) S.O.Lindberg ex Arnell
Pohlia proligera Brotherus
Pohlia pseudobarbula H.Crum ex A.J.Shaw
Pohlia pseudodefecta Ochi
Pohlia pseudogracilis Brotherus
Pohlia pseudophilonotula Brotherus
Pohlia pulvinata (Kindb.) Broth.
Pohlia rabunbaldensis A.J.Shaw
Pohlia ramannii Warnst.
Pohlia revolvens Noguchi
Pohlia rhaetica Brotherus
Pohlia richardsii A.J.Shaw
Pohlia rigescens Brotherus
Pohlia robertsonii Shevock & A.J.Shaw
Pohlia rostrata Brotherus
Pohlia rubella Brotherus
Pohlia rusbyana Brotherus
Pohlia saitoi Ochi
Pohlia saprophila Brotherus
Pohlia schisticola Brotherus
Pohlia scotica Crundwell
Pohlia silvatica Warnstorf
Pohlia simii Schelpe
Pohlia sphagnicola Brotherus
Pohlia spongnicola (Bsg) Lindb. & Arn.
Pohlia squarrosa (Hedw.) Spreng.
Pohlia stewartii E.B.Bartram
Pohlia subannulata Brotherus
Pohlia subcarnea (Schimp.) Iisiba
Pohlia subcarnea Iishiba
Pohlia subcompactula Wijk & Margadant
Pohlia subleptopoda F.J.Hermann
Pohlia subpolymorpha (Kindb.) Broth.
Pohlia suzukii Ochi
Pohlia tapintzense Redfearn & B.C.Tan
Pohlia tapintzensis (Besch.) Redf. & B.C.Tan
Pohlia tenuifolia Brotherus
Pohlia timmioides Chen Pan-chieh ex Redfearn & B.C.Tan
Pohlia tozeri (Grev.) Delogne
Pohlia trematodontea Brotherus
Pohlia tundrae A.J.Shaw
Pohlia turgens A.J.Shaw
Pohlia uematsui Broth.
Pohlia verrucosa Brotherus
Pohlia vestitissima Sakurai
Pohlia vexans H.Lindberg
Pohlia viridis Lindberg & H.Arnell
Pohlia wahlenbergii Andrews
Pohlia wilsonii (Mitt.) Ochyra
Pohlia yanoi Ochi
Pohlia yunnanensis Brotherus

References 

Mniaceae
Moss genera